M143 or M-143 may refer to:

 M143 bomblet, a biological cluster bomb sub-munition developed by the United States during the 1960s
 M-143 (Michigan highway), a highway in south central Michigan, U.S
 Malaysia Federal Route 143
 M143 Mercedes-Benz engine
 M143 Air Data Subsystem on the AH1-F variant of the Bell AH-1 Cobra helicopter
 M-143 variant of the Tupolev Tu-143 Soviet unmanned reconnaissance aircraft
 M-143 pipeline of the Rincon Oil Field, southern California, U.S.